Hughes County is the name of two counties in the United States:

Hughes County, Oklahoma 
Hughes County, South Dakota